Christ Church in Lloyd Street North, Moss Side, Manchester, England, is an Anglican church of 1899–1904 by W. Cecil Hardisty. It was designated a Grade II* listed building on 24 April 1987.

The church is of red brick in an "Arts and Crafts Perpendicular" style. Pevsner considered it Hardisty's "best (building) in Manchester". Decoration is concentrated on the west front, "where a bellcote sits roguishly on one shank of the gable". Most of the original furnishings have gone, although some replacement pieces have been brought in from demolished churches—such as the reredos from St Edward, Holbeck, Leeds.

See also

 List of churches in Greater Manchester
 Grade II* listed buildings in Greater Manchester
 Listed buildings in Manchester-M14

Notes

References

External links
Christ Church, Moss Side; A Church Near You

Grade II* listed churches in Manchester
Churches in Manchester
Church of England church buildings in Greater Manchester
Churches completed in 1904
20th-century Church of England church buildings